Jim Haller is an American former college basketball coach. He was head men's coach for Baylor University from 1977 to 1985.

Haller went to Thomas Jefferson High School in Dallas, then played college basketball at Lon Morris College and Sam Houston State. After stints coaching at McCallum and Austin high schools in Austin, Texas, he became head coach for McLennan Community College in 1972. At his one season at McLennan, he led the team to a 24–2 record. This success attracted the attention of new Baylor coach Carroll Dawson, who hired the then-27 year old Haller as an assistant.

Haller served as an assistant until 1977, when Dawson unexpectedly resigned during the 1976–77 season and he was elevated to the head coach role. Haller finished that season and continued as head coach for nine seasons. In the 1984–85 season, Haller was recorded by one of his players discussing steroid use and suggesting the player use travel per diem in a way not allowed by the NCAA. Haller resigned under fire in February of that season. His overall record at Baylor was 102–130 for a .440 winning percentage.

References

External links
Coaching record

Living people
American men's basketball coaches
American men's basketball players
Basketball coaches from Texas
Basketball players from Dallas
Baylor Bears men's basketball coaches
College men's basketball head coaches in the United States
High school basketball coaches in Texas
Junior college men's basketball coaches in the United States
Lon Morris Bearcats basketball players
Sam Houston Bearkats men's basketball players
Sportspeople from Dallas
Texas A&M University alumni
Year of birth missing (living people)